Misunderstood is the debut studio album by American rapper Yung Bans. The album was released on July 24, 2019 through Foundation Media. The album features guest appearances by YNW Melly, XXXTentacion, Gunna, Young Thug, Future, among others.

Background
On July 5, 2019, Yung Bans announced the album along with its album art and tracklist. 
Polyphia guitarist Tim Henson is featured playing guitar on the album.

Singles
The album's lead single, "Going Wild", was released on July 24, 2019. The music video for the song was released the same day.

Track listing
Credits adapted from Tidal. and Spotify.

Notes
  signifies an uncredited co-producer

References

2019 debut albums
Yung Bans albums